Tie Me Kangaroo Down Sport is a studio album by Pat Boone, released in 1963 on Dot Records.

Track listing

References 

1963 albums
Pat Boone albums
Dot Records albums